Cucullia pulla is a species of moth in the family Noctuidae (the owlet moths). It was first described by Augustus Radcliffe Grote in 1881 and it is found in North America.

The MONA or Hodges number for Cucullia pulla is 10180.

References

Further reading

 
 
 

Cucullia
Articles created by Qbugbot
Moths described in 1881